Eduard Vääri (26 June 1926 Lapetukme, Valguta Parish – 17 May 2005) was an Estonian linguist.

In 1950 he graduated from Tartu University. Since 1951 he taught at Tartu University, since 1978 a professor. 1976-1978 he taught Estonian language at Helsinki University.

His main fields of research were: Livonian language and culture, general linguistics, teaching of Estonian language.

In 1999 he established the organization Estonian Language Protection Association.

Awards:
 2001: Wiedemann Language Award
 2004: Order of the White Star, IV class.

Works

References

1926 births
2005 deaths
Linguists from Estonia
University of Tartu alumni
Academic staff of the University of Tartu
Academic staff of the University of Helsinki
People from Elva Parish